Borasseae is a tribe in the palm subfamily Coryphoideae. The tribe ranges from southern Africa and Madagascar north through the Arabian Peninsula to India, Indochina, Indonesia and New Guinea. Several genera are restricted to islands in the Indian Ocean. The two largest genera, Hyphaene and Borassus, are also the most widespread.

Description
Borassoid palms typically have large, column-like trunks, though several species of Hyphaene have branching or clustered stems. The leaves are large, palmate and often with spines or sharp edges along the petioles. Leaves are retained on young palm stems, later falling to reveal prominent scars. All genera in the Borasseae are dioecious, with separate male and female trees; they are pleonanthic, flowering regularly for many years. Inflorescences are large and pendulous; the male flowers are much smaller than the female and are borne in clusters within catkin-like structures. Fruits contain hard, woody endocarps surrounding the seeds; they range in size from date-sized (Latania) to the massive fruits of Lodoicea, which contain the largest seed in the world.

Taxonomy
The Borasseae is one of eight tribes in subfamily Coryphoideae. The tribe is monophyletic and most phylogenetic studies place it as sister to tribe Corypheae, though it is also close to tribe Caryoteae and tribe Chuniophoeniceae. Together, the four tribes make up the syncarpous clade, all members of which have syncarpous ovaries with united carpels.

The eight genera of tribe Borasseae split evenly into two subtribes. In the palms of subtribe Hyphaenieae, both the male and female flowers are sunken within pits and the fruits are stalked and typically one-seeded. Bismarckia (1 sp., B. nobilis) and Satranala (1 sp., S. decussilvae) are endemic to Madagascar, Medemia (1 sp., M. argun) is restricted to Egypt and Sudan, while Hyphaene (8 spp.) ranges from southern Africa and Madagascar to western India. In subtribe Lataniieae, only the male flowers are sunken in pits and the fruits are sessile, with 1-3 seeds. Lodoicea (1 sp., L. maldivica) is endemic to the Seychelles, Latania (3 spp.) is endemic to the Mascarene Islands, while Borassodendron has two species, one in Borneo (B. borneense) and one in the Malay Peninsula (B. machadonis). The last of the genera, Borassus (5 spp.), is the most widespread and is found in Sub-Saharan Africa, Madagascar, Southeast Asia and New Guinea. An extinct genus of the subtribe Hyphaeninae is known from the Maastrichtian aged Intertrappean Beds of India.

Conservation
Many species in tribe Borasseae are threatened with extinction (36% of total recognized species):
 Borassodendron machadonis - Vulnerable
 Borassus madagascariensis - Endangered
 Latania loddigesii - Endangered
 Latania lontaroides - Endangered
 Latania verschaffeltii - Endangered
 Lodoicea maldivica - Endangered
 Medemia argun - Critically Endangered
 Satranala decussilvae - Endangered

Gallery

References

 
Monocot tribes